Minnesota provided a large number of units in the American Civil War proportionate to its small population of approximately 170,000 in 1861-1865, with some 26,717 state volunteers being recorded, although a number of those are individuals who reenlisted in other units.

Infantry units
 1st Minnesota Infantry Regiment
 2nd Minnesota Infantry Regiment
 3rd Minnesota Infantry Regiment
 4th Minnesota Infantry Regiment
 5th Minnesota Infantry Regiment
 6th Minnesota Infantry Regiment
 7th Minnesota Infantry Regiment
 8th Minnesota Infantry Regiment
 9th Minnesota Infantry Regiment
 10th Minnesota Infantry Regiment
 11th Minnesota Infantry Regiment
 1st Minnesota Infantry Battalion
 1st Minnesota Sharpshooters Company
 2nd Minnesota Sharpshooters Company

Cavalry units
 1st Minnesota Mounted Rangers
 2nd Minnesota Cavalry Regiment
 Brackett's Battalion, Minnesota Cavalry
 Hatch's Battalion, Minnesota Cavalry

Artillery units
 1st Minnesota Heavy Artillery Regiment
 1st Minnesota Light Artillery Battery
 2nd Minnesota Light Artillery Battery
 3rd Minnesota Light Artillery Battery

See also
 Lists of American Civil War Regiments by State

References
 

Minnesota in the American Civil War
 
Civil War Units
Minnesota